This is a tentative list of butterfly species and subspecies found in Sikkim, an Indian state in northeast India.

Family: Papilionidae

Subfamily: Papilioninae 
Tribe: Leptocircini

Genus: Graphium (swordtails, bluebottles and jays)

Species: Graphium cloanthus (glassy bluebottle) 
Subspecies: Graphium cloanthus cloanthus (Himalayan glassy bluebottle)

Tribe: Papilionini

Species: Papilio bianor (common peacock) 
Subspecies: Papilio bianor ganesa (east Himalayan common peacock)

Species: Papilio helenus (red Helen) 
Subspecies: Papilio helenus helenus (Oriental red Helen)

Species: Papilio nephelus (yellow Helen) 
Subspecies: Papilio nephelus chaon (Khasi yellow Helen)

Family: Pieridae

Subfamily: Pierinae 
Tribe: Pierini

Genus: Delias (Jezebels)

Species: Delias agostina (yellow Jezebel) 
 Subspecies: Delias agostina agostina (Sikkim yellow Jezebel)

Genus: Pieris

Species: Pieris canidia (Asian cabbage white) 
 Subspecies: Pieris canidia indica (Indian cabbage white)

Family: Lycaenidae

Subfamily: Miletinae 
Tribe: Miletini

Genus: Allotinus

Species: Allotinus drumila (crenulate mottle) 
Subspecies: Allotinus drumila drumila (Himalayan Crenulate Mottle)

Subfamily: Polyommatinae 
Tribe: Polyommatini

Genus: Acytolepis

Species: Acytolepis puspa (common hedge blue) 
Subspecies: Acytolepis puspa gisca (Himalayan common hedge blue)

Genus: Jamides

Species: Jamides alecto (metallic cerulean) 
Subspecies: Jamides alecto eurysaces (Himalayan metallic cerulean)

Subfamily: Theclinae 
Tribe: Hypolycaenini

Genus: Hypolycaena

Species: Hypolycaena kina (blue tit) 
Subspecies: Hypolycaena kina kina (Darjeeling blue tit)

Family: Nymphalidae

Subfamily: Cyrestinae

Genus: Chersonesia

Species: Chersonesia risa (common maplet)

Subfamily: Heliconiinae 
Tribe: Acraeini

Genus: Acraea

Species: Acraea issoria (yellow coster)

Subfamily: Libytheinae

Genus: Libythea

Species: Libythea myrrha (club beak)

Subfamily: Limenitidinae 
Tribe: Adoliadini

Genus: bassarona

Species: Bassarona durga (blue duke) 
Subspecies: bassarona durga durga (Himalayan blue duke)

Species: Tanaecia julii (common earl) 
Subspecies: Tanaecia julii appiades (changeable common earl)

Tribe: Limenitidini

Genus: Athyma

Species: Athyma jina (Bhutan sergeant) 
Subspecies: Athyma jina jina (sullied Bhutan sergeant)

Subfamily: Nymphalinae 
Tribe: Junoniini

Genus: Junonia

Species: Junonia iphita (chocolate pansy) 

Tribe: Nymphalini

Genus: Aglais

Species: Aglais caschmirensis (Indian tortoiseshell) 
Subspecies: Aglais caschmirensis aesis (Himalayan tortoiseshell)

Subfamily: Pseudergolinae 
Tribe: Pseudergolini

Genus: Pseudergolis

Species: Pseudergolis wedah (tabby)

Genus: Stibochiona

Species: Stibochiona nicea (popinjay)

Subfamily: Satyrinae 
Tribe: Elymniini

Genus: Elymnias

Species: Elymnias malelas (spotted palmfly) 
Subspecies: Elymnias malelas malelas (Bengal spotted palmfly)

Tribe: Satyrini

Genus: Lethe

Species: Lethe verma (straight-banded treebrown) 
Subspecies: Lethe verma sintica (east Himalayan straight-banded treebrown)

Genus: Mycalesis

Species: Mycalesis visala (long-branded bushbrown)

Family: Riodinidae

Subfamily: Nemeobiinae 
Tribe: Abisarini

Genus: Abisara

Species: Abisara chela (spot Judy) 
Subspecies: Abisara chela chela (Sikkim spot Judy)

Tribe: Nemeobiini

Genus: Zemeros

Species: Zemeros flegyas (Punchinello) 
Subspecies: Zemeros flegyas flegyas (Himalayan Punchinello)

Family: Hesperiidae

Subfamily: Hesperiinae 
Tribe: Aeromachini

Genus: Aeromachus

Species: Aeromachus stigmata (veined scrub hopper)

Genus: Ancistroides

Species: Ancistroides nigrita (chocolate demon)

Genus: Pedesta

Species: Pedesta pandita (brown bush bob)

Genus: Sebastonyma

Species: Sebastonyma dolopia (tufted ace)

Genus: Zographetus

Species: Zographetus ogygia (purple-spotted flitter) 
Subspecies: Zographetus ogygia ogygia (continental purple-spotted flitter)

Tribe: Baorini

Genus: Pelopidas

Species: Pelopidas assamensis (great swift)

Genus: Polytremis

Species: Polytremis eltola (yellow-spot swift) 
Subspecies: Polytremis eltola eltola (Darjeeling yellow-spot swift)

Tribe: Taractrocerini

Genus: Telicota

Species: Telicota bambusae (dark palm-dart)

Subfamily: Pyrginae 
Tribe: Tagiadini

Genus: Coladenia

Species: Coladenia indrani (tricolor pied flat)

Genus: Mooreana

Species: Mooreana trichoneura (yellow flat)

Genus: Tagiades

Species: Tagiades menaka (spotted snow flat)
'Subspecies: Tagiades menaka menaka'' (Bengal spotted snow flat)

References

Butterflies of India
India Biodiversity Portal
Fauna of British India. Butterflies 1 by Talbot G
Fauna of British India. Butterflies 2 by Talbot G.

Lists of butterflies of India
Lepidoptera of India